RETALT (RETro Propulsion Assisted Landing Technologies) is a project for aiming to investigate in key technologies for retropropulsion reusable launch systems established in March 2019 with funds from the European Union's Horizon 2020 program. It aims to "advance the research and development of key technologies for European vertical-landing launch vehicles."

The reference configurations for the development of the targeted technologies are two types of vertical launch and landing rockets a two-stage-to-orbit and a single-stage to orbit . The partner organisations are DLR, CFS Engineering (Switzerland), Elecnor Deimos (Spain), MT Aerospace (Germany), Almatech (Switzerland) and Amorim Cork Composites (Portugal).

See also

 Adeline (rocket stage)
 Comparison of orbital launchers families
 Liquid fly-back booster, a cancelled DLR project to develop reusable boosters for Ariane 5
 Reusable launch system
 Winged Reusable Sounding rocket (WIRES)

References

Rocket stages
Proposed reusable launch systems
Space launch vehicles of Germany
Space launch vehicles of Europe
Spaceflight
European Commission projects
European Union and science and technology